Liang Xiaojing (Chinese: 梁小静; born 7 April 1997) is a Chinese sprinter.  She is the champion of the 2014 Summer Youth Olympics at 100 metres.  She competed in the women's 200 metres event at the 2015 World Championships in Athletics in Beijing without advancing from the first round. She also has served on the Chinese 4 × 100 metre relay team at both the World Championships and the 2016 Olympics where she anchored the relay.

International Competitions

1Disqualified in the final

Personal bests
Information from World Athletics profile unless otherwise noted.

Outdoor
100 metres – 11.13 (+0.7 m/s, Berlin 2019)
200 metres – 22.93 (+0.2 m/s, Shenyang 2019)
400 metres – 54.76 (Weifang 2013)
Indoor
60 metres – 7.17 (Louisville 2022)
200 metres – 23.99 (Beijing 2014)

References

External links

1997 births
Living people
People from Zhaoqing
Runners from Guangdong
Chinese female sprinters
World Athletics Championships athletes for China
Olympic athletes of China
Athletes (track and field) at the 2016 Summer Olympics
Asian Games silver medalists for China
Asian Games medalists in athletics (track and field)
Athletes (track and field) at the 2018 Asian Games
Medalists at the 2018 Asian Games
Athletes (track and field) at the 2014 Summer Youth Olympics
Youth Olympic gold medalists for China
Asian Indoor Athletics Championships winners
Youth Olympic gold medalists in athletics (track and field)
Athletes (track and field) at the 2020 Summer Olympics
Olympic female sprinters
21st-century Chinese women